Scott Reid (born November 25, 1976) is a Canadian former professional ice hockey goaltender.

Career 
Reid is a two-time Central Hockey League (CHL) All-Star. During the 2003–04 season he collected 6 shutouts and 32 wins, and led the CHL with 1523 saves a .938 save percentage. Reid was recognized for his standout play when he was awarded the 2004 Scott Brower Memorial Trophy as the CHL's Most Outstanding Goaltender.

Personal life 
Reid is the husband of two-time gold medal Olympic ice hockey defender Meaghan Mikkelson.

Awards and honors

References

External links

1976 births
Living people
Alaska Aces (ECHL) players
Arizona Sundogs players
Bakersfield Fog players
Canadian ice hockey goaltenders
Corpus Christi Rayz players
Edinburgh Capitals players
Kamloops Blazers players
Milwaukee Admirals players
New Mexico Scorpions (CHL) players
Norfolk Admirals players
Peoria Rivermen (AHL) players
Reno Rage players
Rocky Mountain Rage players
San Angelo Saints players
San Antonio Iguanas players
Saskatoon Blades players
Seattle Thunderbirds players
Fort Worth Brahmas players
Tri-City Americans players
People from Grande Prairie
Ice hockey people from Alberta
Canadian expatriate ice hockey players in Scotland
Canadian expatriate ice hockey players in the United States